Leslieville is a hamlet in Alberta, Canada within Clearwater County.

The hamlet is located in Census Division No. 9 and in the federal riding of Wetaskiwin.  It was first settled in 1903.

Demographics 

See also 
List of communities in Alberta
List of designated places in Alberta
List of hamlets in Alberta

References 

Clearwater County, Alberta
Hamlets in Alberta
Designated places in Alberta